Surumaitta Kannukal is a 1983 Indian Malayalam film, directed by S. Konnanatt and produced by K. Manoharan and K. Sreedharan. The film stars Vijayaraghavan, Bahadoor, K. P. Ummer, Mamukkoya and Sunanda in the lead roles. The film has musical score by K. Raghavan.

Cast

Vijayaraghavan
K. P. Ummer
Bahadoor
Nellikode Bhaskaran
Kunjandi
Mamukkoya
Sunanda
Vijayalakshmi
Santha Devi
Santhakumari
Kuttyedathi Vilasini

Soundtrack
The music was composed by K. Raghavan and the lyrics were written by P. Bhaskaran.

References

External links
 

1983 films
1980s Malayalam-language films